Chiclana de la Frontera is a town and municipality in southwestern Spain, in the province of Cádiz, Andalucía, near the Gulf of Cádiz. It belongs to the association of municipalities of the Bay of Cádiz (Bahía de Cádiz), the provincial capital of Cádiz, Jerez de la Frontera, San Fernando, El Puerto de Santa María, Puerto Real and Rota which form the third largest metropolitan area in Andalusia, behind Seville and Málaga, and the twelfth largest in Spain. In 1877, the municipality's population was 11,677; in 2012, it was 81,473. The municipality contains the largest number of hotel beds in the Province of Cádiz and the Costa de la Luz. The town's newspaper, Chiclana Información, is distributed on Saturday mornings.

History

Human presence in the area dates back to Paleolithic times. Several Neolithic era villages have been unearthed in the area including that of La Mesa. During the 1st century, the Phoenicians settled near the town, particularly in the small island, Islote de Sancti Petri, founding a temple dedicated to their God, Melqart. When the Romans arrived they dedicated the temple to Hercules. A marble statue of a Roman emperor deified during the 2nd century was found in the waters of Sancti Petri in 1905. An ancient stronghold of the Phoenicians, remains from the Phoenicians, Carthaginians and Romans unearthed in Chiclana are in the Museum of Cádiz.

The Christians led by Alonso Pérez de Guzmán (1256–1309) entered the town in 1303 after the moor, who have settled in Southern Spain since the 8th Century, had deserted it. Guzman claimed these territories for the crown of Castille, and his possessions in Southern Spain eventually led to the foundation of the dukedom of Medina-Sidonia. During the Spanish War of Independence came the Battle of Chiclana, which took place in the town between the French and an Anglo-Spanish alliance. In 1900, tenders were invited by the municipal authorities, Le Secretariat del Ayuntamienti de Chiclana de la Frontera, for an electric lighting concession of the town. In the early 20th century, seasonal Algarvian migration brought workers to Chiclana's cereal fields. Sancti Petri was visited in 1930 by Manuel de Falla, seeking inspiration.

Geography and climate
Chiclana de la Frontera is located on the Costa de la Luz of the southern coast of Spain, in lower Andalusia on the southwest coast of the province of Cádiz. The municipality borders Puerto Real to the north, San Fernando to the north-northwest and Conil de la Frontera to the south-southeast. Villages in the municipality include La Coquina, Los Gallos Cerromolinos, Pinar de los Guisos, Llano de las Maravillas, Las Veguetas, La Barrosa, Novo Sancti Petri, Melilla, Campano, El Olivar, Torre del Puerco, El Colorado, Barrio Nuevo, Hozanejos and Pago del Humo and Las Veguetas, although it is difficult to distinguish the exact boundaries of many of the settlements as many of the villages are joined.

There are numerous hills to the northeast of the municipality. The municipality and town of Chiclana is crossed by the River Iro which rises in Lago Salado and empties into the small Bay of Sancti Petri. The relief of the land in the municipality is irregular but smooth, with slight undulations.

Chiclana's climate, as in the Bay of Cádiz, is typical of the southern Atlantic coast of Spain. The town has approximately 3,000 hours of sunshine a year. The strongest winds usually rises in the east or southwest during the summer and late autumn and spring. The municipality has a number of pine, olive, oak and chaparral trees growing within it and it contains the Parque Forestal Municipal "Pinar del Hierro y de la Espartosa"; the park is popular with hikers and mountain bikers.

Economy

Fontanar was an amphora-producing center in Chiclana de la Frontera which manufactured fish sauce transportation containers, possibly dating to the reign of Augustus. In the 19th century, Chiclana manufactured linen and earthenware, and produced brandy, while tourists visited the mineral baths. The Rough guide to Andalucía describes Novo Sancti Petri as "a complex of hundreds of identical avenues lined with featureless tile-roofed dwellings, ugly lamp standards, over-manicured gardens and a golf course designed by Severiano Ballesteros." The municipality contains the largest number of hotel beds in the province of Cádiz and the Costa de la Luz and has about 20 luxury hotels which have either four or five stars. Notable golf courses include the 36-hole Club de Golf Novo Sancti Petri, the 18-hole Club de golf Melia Sancti Petri, the 9-hole Club de Golf Campano, European Golfes Academy, Escuela de golf Practeegolf and Campo de golf Lomas de Sancti Petri. The Playa de la Barrosa beach stretching from the point of Sancti Petri down to Cape Trafalgar also has many restaurants, bars, and markets. The town centre of Chiclana itself is located around the town hall square and has a busy market where fruit and vegetables are sold, as well as fish and meat stalls; retailers from rural parts come to the market to sell items such as wild asparagus, snails and herbs. The Tuesday market is held by the blue bridge over the River Iro. Aside from the town's salt processing reputation, it is also a centre for furniture manufacturing and contains many furniture stores along the Avenida de los Descubrimientos.

The area is a fertile region, with much agriculture, including vineyards. Wine has been grown in the area for many centuries and this is recognized as having had considerable importance in the field of winemaking, especially starting in the 16th century with the rise of trade and the new discoveries in the Americas, when land was increasingly converted to produce wine for America, Flanders, England, France and Portugal. The industry reached its peak during the 19th century, which was when it had the largest area of land devoted to grape growing and the largest number of wineries. Currently, Chiclana has different wineries where fine wines both fragrant and muscatel are grown, and the wineries are visited by many tourists. The town is noted for its sherry and its Rioja (although Rioja is not actually produced in Andalusia), and Chiclana de la Frontera has been cited as one of the world's finest wine-producing areas. La Bodega Cooperativa Unión de Viticultores Chiclaneros, incorporated as a cooperative in 1992, is one of several local wineries currently in operation.

Main sights

Towers
There are three significant towers in the area. The Torre del Puerco dates to the 16th century, but later was used as a defensive post during the Battle of Barrosa in 1811. The Torre Bermeja is a defensive tower located on the Playa de la Barrosa. The Torre del Reloj is the clock tower, popularly known as Arquillo Clock, and is one of the most emblematic buildings of Chiclana, located on the Plaza Mayor. It was built in the 18th century on one of the ancient gates of the town, and was originally part of the old Town Hall. It consists of four sections, with an octagonal bell tower and dome topped with a Latin cross. The tower is the subject of a poem by Federico García Lorca.

Civic buildings
The historic city center is home to several examples of neoclassical architecture and Elizabethan houses that belonged to the nobility and gentry of Cádiz, built to enrichment of the area thanks to trades with America. The Plaza Mayor is the oldest public space and historic interest of Chiclana. It was the center of the village during the 15th to the 18th centuries, containing the only parish jail. Casa Briones, located on the Plaza Mayor is one of the finest examples of 18th-century buildings in the city and is attributed to the neoclassical architect Torcuato Cayon; it currently houses the Museo de Chiclana. The town hall, Casa Consistorial, was originally built on the palatial residence of Alejandro Risso in the 18th century. In 2011, a new building was inaugurated by the President of the Junta de Andalucía, José Antonio Griñan. Built on the former, the latter has an area of about 5,000 square metres, divided over four floors. It is a large, modern building, adapted to the needs of local administration in Chiclana in the 21st century. The original building had no architectural interest, so only the main façade of the old building was preserved, along with the first bay, and the imperial staircase.

Castles and palaces

The Castillo de Sancti Petri was built in the Moorish architecture style during the 13th century and is now in a ruined state. The Casa-palacio del Conde de Torres is located in the Plaza del Retortillo of this city, nominated in honor of José de Retortillo who was awarded a knighthood in 1738 by the then reigning monarch Philip IV. It is a mansion of two stories with stylistic influences of the neoclassical period, but also featuring decorative elements of the baroque. Today the house has ceded part of its private garden to the city, which maintains it as a green area for public use.

Casa-palacio del Conde del Pinar is located in the central Calle Fierro. It is named after Conde del Pinar, an important character of French origin who arrived in the city of Cádiz, who like many others was attracted by economic expansion as a result of their trade with America. Built during the 18th century, it shows the evolution of the neoclassical baroque, mixing elements of both styles. It has a high façade exterior with three floors and is structured with stone pillars. Inside is a square courtyard with columns and marble floors and the original staircase. Currently it is used by the government for cultural activities. The Casa-palacio del Conde de las Cinco Torres is located in the centre of the city on the Calle García Gutiérrez, and as far as the mid-19th century dominated the neighborhood of San Alejandro. The house is perhaps the best example of neo-classical mansion in the city, built during the 18th century at the time of greatest economic boom in Cádiz. The exterior has a stone façade, two stories high and with five vertical streets.

Churches 

The Capilla del Santo Cristo (Chapel of the Holy Christ), dating from the late 15th century, is the oldest religious building in the city. It is situated within the confraternity of the Vera Cruz, one of the oldest existing penitential brotherhoods in Andalusia. The current façade of the church is a result of the many restorations that the building has experienced. The chapel contains a huge atrium.

There are two religious buildings from the 16th century. The Iglesia de San Sebastián, which is located next to the bridge of Remedios. This church has undergone several renovations throughout its history. In the courtyard stands a monument to Antonio Cabrera, a speaker, scientist and botanist and son of the town. The Hospital de San Martín is now part of the "Niño Jesús" college. Although it has undergone several reforms, this old building remained inside the Capilla del Sagrado Corazón, with several Baroque altarpieces. 17th century religious buildings include the Convento de Jesús Nazareno, a baroque church founded by Mother Antonia de Jesús in the year 1666; as well as the Iglesia de la Santísima Trinidad (San Telmo) which has a high Baroque style altar and has a belfry with a unique angular design.

The 18th century Iglesia de San Juan Bautista (Iglesia Mayor) is a neoclassical masterpiece of the province of Cádiz. Designed by Torcuato Cayón and finished by his godson and pupil Torcuato Benjumeda. It is built on an earlier church, which retains one of its chapels and a 16th-century Flemish altarpiece. It possesses carvings of great value and several paintings from the Zurbarán school. The church has been listed as a Cultural Monument since 1975. The Ermita de Santa Ana was built by Cayón in 1771. It is a visual icon of the city and is its highest point, offering a panorama for kilometers around. An octagonal chapel, it is surrounded by an octagonal arcade portico. The building houses the icon of Santa Ana, carved by the Genoese Domingo Giscardi in the 18th century.

Culture

Museums
The Museo de Chiclana is located in the Casa de los Briones on the Plaza Mayor. In different rooms, the public can learn about the prehistoric period and antiquity of the city, its formation, the Battle of Chiclana and the present day. It has sections dedicated also to the local wine industry, horticulture, salt industry and fishing. All of the displays are labelled and an audiovisual exhibition provides an overview of the history and traditions of Chiclana, in an entertaining, accessible and understandable manner. In addition, the museum has several rooms designed to house temporary exhibitions. The matador and celebrity Francisco de Paula Montes y Reina, better known as by his nickname, Paquiro, was born in Chiclana in 1805, the Museo Municipal Taurino Francisco Montes is dedicated to him. On November 3, 2016, the new "Wine and Salt Museum" opened opposite the market hall in a renovated bodega. Founded in 1928, the Marín Dolls Museum-Factory is a factory and museum which created and exhibited traditional Marín dolls, but it is now closed.

Festivals

Chiclana de la Frontera celebrates several festivals and feast days. Carnaval is held at the beginning of Lent the festival includes a parade and performances. The San Antonio Fair is held in mid June. There is a parade and dancing in the stands, and an opportunity for women to wear local costumes. The celebration of Corpus Christi includes streets decorated with rosemary, incense and altars; there is also a religious procession. The Festival of El Pilar celebrates the Virgen del Pilar, patron of the State Security Forces; the icon is located in the Church of San Juan Bautista. Cruces de Mayo chiclaneras festival occurs in May with a procession. Typically, courtyards are decorated with flowers and religious symbols. The Festival of Parpuja occurs in August and consists of a gala attended by the leading national figures of flamenco such as José Mercé, Rancapino, and others. Traditional foods are accompanied by wines from Chiclana.

Feast days are celebrated as rites of the Catholic religion. These include the Feast of San Juan Bautista, held on 23–24 June, in which a procession is accompanied by brass bands in the Plaza Mayor. A typical dish at this time of year are snails. The Feast of Our Lady of Mount Caramel, held on July 16, venerates the Virgin del Carmen Barrosa, an icon of which is used in the procession. The Feast of Santa Ana, held on July 26, includes a procession-pilgrimage featuring Santa Ana through the center of the city and the Santa Ana neighborhood. There are festivities around the shrine of this saint. A typical dish at this time are the sweets "Campanas de Santa Ana". The Feast of Our Lady of Remedies, held on September 8, includes a procession featuring the icon of the Virgen de los Remedios, patron saint of the city. Another tribute to the patron features horse riders competing in front of the Parish of the Holy Trinity (San Telmo). There is also a traditional pressing of the grapes, which symbolizes the beginning of the harvest. In recent years, this day also celebrates the Feast of Pescao of Estero, a fish tasting event at the Alameda del Rio. The Feast of All Saints Tosantos is celebrated on November 1.

In fiction 
 Cornwell, Bernard, Sharpe's Fury: Richard Sharpe and the Battle of Barrosa, March 1811, HarperCollins, 2006, 
 "The Girl at the Inn" (Spanish: La niña de la venta): a 1951 Spanish musical comedy film directed by Ramón Torrado and starring Lola Flores, Manolo Caracol and Manuel Requena that takes place in Cadiz. It was shot in the fishing village of Sancti Petri, in Chiclana de la Frontera.

Notable people

 Antonio Alemania, singer, songwriter
 Antonio García Gutiérrez,  poet, playwright and librettist
 Sebastián Gessa y Arias (1840–1920), painter
 Fernando Quiñones, writer
 Enrique Montero Ruiz, musician
 Antonio Cabrera y Curro, priest, philosopher and botanist
 Juan Álvarez Mendizábal, Minister of Finance and former Prime Minister
 Enrique de las Morenas y Fossi, Captain of "Los Últimos de Filipinas" during the Spanish War of Independence
 José Marín Verdugo, artist and entrepreneur
 La Prohibida
 José Moreno, actor
 Pepa Rus, actress
 El Granaíno (Juan José Jiménez Ramos)
 Rancapino, singer
 José Manuel Moreno (cyclist), cyclist, Olympic champion in 1992
 José Antonio Butrón, Motocross champion
 Jesús Ruiz "Jesuli", volleyball player and Mediterranean Games gold medalist
 Manuel Muñoz Ramírez, footballer known as Manolito
 Fernando Casas, physician of King Fernando VII
 Francisco Montes Reina, bullfighter

Twin towns
  Chiclana de Segura, Spain
  Úbeda, Spain
  El Astillero, Spain
  Béziers, France
  Alcácer do Sal, Portugal

References

External links

 Official website, Junta de Andalucia
 Official website, Town Hall (Spanish)

 
Costa de la Luz
Municipalities of the Province of Cádiz
Port cities and towns on the Spanish Atlantic coast